This is a list of highest points in the U.S. state of Washington, in alphabetical order by county.

References

Sources
 List maintained at Peakbagger.com

External links
The High Points of the 39 Counties of Washington, John Roper

Highest points by county
Geography of Washington (state)
Highpointing

Washington